Communist Students may refer to two existing organisations:

 Communist Students (Autonomous)
 Communist Students (Young Communist League)